Sowgoli Tappeh (also Romanized as Sowgolī Tappeh) is a village in Zarrineh Rud-e Jonubi Rural District of the Central District of Miandoab County, West Azerbaijan province, Iran. At the 2006 National Census, its population was 2,945 in 745 households. The following census in 2011 counted 2,931 people in 866 households. The latest census in 2016 showed a population of 3,169 people in 977 households; it was the largest village in its rural district.

References 

Miandoab County

Populated places in West Azerbaijan Province

Populated places in Miandoab County